Glandularia, common name mock vervain or mock verbena, is a genus of annual and perennial herbaceous flowering plants in the family Verbenaceae. They are native to the Americas.

Description
These plants, like their relatives the vervains (verbenas), usually have showy five-petalled flowers in shades of pink, purple and blue.

Taxonomy
Glandularia species are closely related to the true vervains and sometimes still included with them in Verbena. Horizontal chloroplast transfer occurred at least twice and possibly three times between these genera, which are otherwise too distinct to warrant unification. Somehow, chloroplasts from V. orcuttiana, swamp verbena (V. hastata) or a close relative of these had admixed into the G. bipinnatifida genome. Although hybridization runs rampant in the true and mock vervains – the ancestors of the well-known garden vervain are quite obscure – it does not seem to have been the cause of the cross-species gene transfer.

Research has found a signal of one more transfer event. This had introduced chloroplasts from an ancestral member of the Verbena lineage nowadays found in South America into Glandularia. Although all members of the present genus can be distinguished to have a chromosome count of five, the South American species are diploid, while polyploid hybrid Glandularia are very widespread from northern Central America northwards. The second genetic introgression must have occurred before the genus spread north, as species with the Verbena-like chloroplasts are found all over the Americas. Since the new chloroplast genes replaced the old ones, it may be that the possibly hybridogenic G. bipinnatifida actually underwent horizontal chloroplast transfer twice in its evolutionary history.

Cultivation
A large number of cultivars, in shades of white, pink, blue and purple, have been developed for garden use, and are particularly suitable for containers - window-boxes and hanging baskets. Though tender perennials, they are usually grown in temperate areas as half-hardy annuals (sown under glass), or sold as young plants for planting out after the danger of frost has passed. They are still widely referenced in the British horticulture trade as verbenas. The following have gained the Royal Horticultural Society’s Award of Garden Merit:- 
’Claret’ 
’Donalena Lavender Grace’ (Donalena Series)
Quartz Series 
’Silver Anne’
’Sissinghurst’ 
’Toronto’ (G. canadensis)

Species
The following species are recognised by The Plant List:

Glandularia alejandrana B.L.Turner
Glandularia amoena (Paxton) Umber
Glandularia andalgalensis (Moldenke) P.Peralta
Glandularia angustilobata (Moldenke) P.Peralta & V.Thode
Glandularia araucana (Phil.) Botta
Glandularia aristigera (S.Moore) Tronc.
Glandularia atacamensis (Reiche) J.M.Watson & A.E.Hoffm.
Glandularia aurantiaca (Speg.) Botta
Glandularia bajacalifornica (Moldenke) Umber
Glandularia balansae (Briq.) N.O'Leary
Glandularia bipinnatifida (Schauer) Nutt. – Dakota mock vervain
Glandularia brachyrhynchos G.L.Nesom & Vorobik
Glandularia cabrerae (Moldenke) Botta
Glandularia canadensis (L.) Small – rose mock vervain
Glandularia catharinae (Moldenke) N.O'Leary & P.Peralta
Glandularia cheitmaniana (Moldenke) Botta & Poggio
Glandularia chiricahensis Umber
Glandularia clavata (Ruiz & Pav.) Botta
Glandularia corymbosa (Ruiz & Pav.) N.O'Leary & P.Peralta
Glandularia delticola (Small ex Perry) Umber
Glandularia dissecta (Willd. ex Spreng.) Schnack & Covas
Glandularia dusenii (Moldenke) N.O'Leary & P.Peralta
Glandularia elegans (Kunth) Umber
Glandularia flava (Gillies & Hook.) Schnack & Covas
Glandularia gooddingii (Briq.) Solbrig – southwestern mock vervain
Glandularia guaibensis P.Peralta & V.Thode
Glandularia guaranitica Tronc.
Glandularia gynobasis (Wedd.) N.O'Leary & P.Peralta
Glandularia hassleriana (Briq.) Tronc.
Glandularia hatschbachii (Moldenke) N.O'Leary & P.Peralta
Glandularia herteri (Moldenke) Tronc.
Glandularia humifusa (Cham.) Botta
Glandularia jordanensis (Moldenke) N.O'Leary & P.Peralta
Glandularia kuntzeana (Moldenke) Tronc.
Glandularia laciniata (L.) Schnack & Covas
Glandularia lilacina (Greene) Umber – Cedros Island verbena
Glandularia lilloana (Moldenke) Botta
Glandularia lipozygioides (Walp.) L.E.Navas
Glandularia lobata (Vell.) P.Peralta & V.Thode
Glandularia macrosperma (Speg.) Tronc.
Glandularia maritima (Small) Small
Glandularia marrubioides (Cham.) Tronc.
Glandularia megapotamica (Spreng.) Cabrera & G.Dawson
Glandularia mendocina (Phil.) Covas & Schnack
Glandularia microphylla (Kunth) Cabrera
Glandularia nana (Moldenke) Tronc.
Glandularia paraguariensis (Moldenke) N.O'Leary
Glandularia parodii Covas & Schnack
Glandularia paulensis (Moldenke) A.L.R.Oliveira & Salimena
Glandularia peruviana (L.) Small – Peruvian mock vervain
Glandularia phlogiflora (Cham.) Schnack & Covas
Glandularia platensis (Spreng.) Schnack & Covas
Glandularia polyantha Umber
Glandularia porrigens (Phil.) J.M.Watson & A.E.Hoffm.
Glandularia pulchra (Moldenke) Botta
Glandularia pumila (Rydb.) Umber
Glandularia quadrangulata (A.Heller) Umber
Glandularia racemosa (Eggert) Umber
Glandularia radicans Schnack & Covas
Glandularia rectiloba (Moldenke) P.Peralta & V.Thode
Glandularia reichei (Acevedo) L.E.Navas
Glandularia santiaguensis Covas & Schnack
Glandularia scrobiculata (Griseb.) Tronc.
Glandularia selloi (Spreng.) Tronc.
Glandularia sessilis (Cham.) Tronc.
Glandularia stellarioides (Cham.) Schnack & Covas
Glandularia subincana Tronc.
Glandularia sulphurea (D.Don) Schnack & Covas
Glandularia tampensis (Nash) Small
Glandularia tecticaulis (Tronc.) N.O'Leary
Glandularia tenera (Spreng.) Cabrera
Glandularia tessmannii (Moldenke) P.Peralta & V.Thode
Glandularia teucriifolia (M.Martens & Galeotti) Umber
Glandularia thymoides (Cham.) N.O'Leary
Glandularia tomophylla (Briq.) P.Peralta
Glandularia tristachya (Tronc. & Burkart) Schnack & Covas
Glandularia tumidula (L.M.Perry) Umber
Glandularia turneri G.L.Nesom
Glandularia tweedieana (Niven ex Hook.) P.Peralta
Glandularia venturii (Moldenke) Botta
Glandularia verecunda Umber

References

Verbenaceae
Verbenaceae genera
Taxa named by Johann Friedrich Gmelin